122P/de Vico (provisional designation: 1846 D1) is a periodic comet with an orbital period of 74 years. It fits the classical definition of a Halley-type comet with (20 years < period < 200 years).  It was discovered by Francesco de Vico in Rome on February 20, 1846.

During the 1846 apparition the comet reached a magnitude of 5 in mid March and was last observed in May. Its orbit was found to be elliptical and orbital calculations indicated that it would return between 1919 and 1925, however the comet wasn't detected. It was recovered on 17 September 1995 by the Japanese astronomers Yuji Nakamura, Masaaki Tanaka, and Shougo Utsunomiya, while it was discovered independly within 24 hours by Tsutomu Seki and Don Machholz. By the end of September the comet had a magnitude of 5.5 and was visible by naked eye. It continued to brighten in the start of October, reaching a magnitude of 5.1 before starting to fade gradually. Its tail was reported to be up to seven degrees long. The comet was also observed by Ulysses spacecraft. It was last detected on 25 June 1996.

Daniel Kirkwood in 1884 noticed that the comet shares elements with comet 12P/Pons-Brooks. He suggested that 122P had calved off Pons-Brooks some centuries prior. Later he identified the two comets' capture into their elliptical orbits (or their parent body's capture) with their shared aphelion close to Neptune 991 CE.

References

External links 
 Orbital simulation from JPL (Java) / Horizons Ephemeris
 122P/de Vico – Kazuo Kinoshita (1998 Jan. 27)

Periodic comets
Halley-type comets
0122
122P
18460220